Iranian frigate Alvand is a frigate of the Islamic Republic of Iran Navy and the lead ship of her class.

The ship was originally called Saam, lead ship of the Saam class (which is named after Sām, a mythical hero of ancient Persia, and an important character in the Shahnameh). After the Islamic Revolution the class was renamed to Alvand class, after the Alvand mountain-chain and so this ship, being the lead ship was renamed Alvand.

History 
Her delivery was delayed because the weapon control system was not prepared on time.

She completed her refit on 15 May 1977 at Portsmouth.

It joined the Indian Navy's 'Bridges of Friendship', held in Bombay on 17 February 2001 to celebrate India's 50th anniversary as republic where in 60 Indian vessels and 24 foreign vessels (including Alvand) participated. Alvand appeared to be in good state despite being thirty years old.
In 2010 it participated in the 60th anniversary of the Sri Lanka Navy.

Alvand entered the Suez Canal on 22 February 2011, with the supply vessel , on a deployment reported to be a training mission to Latakia, Syria. In October 2016, Alvand and Buseshr were deployed to the Gulf of Aden, off Yemen. The ship was modernized in 2021.

See also

 List of Imperial Iranian Navy vessels in 1979
 List of current ships of the Islamic Republic of Iran Navy

References

External links

 'AP Video'

Alvand-class frigates
Ships built in Southampton
1968 ships
Frigates of Iran
Iran–Iraq War naval ships of Iran
Frigates of the Cold War